Bour is a village in the commune of Tuntange, in western Luxembourg.  , the town has a population of 64.

Mersch (canton)
Towns in Luxembourg